Ghajinikanth is a 2018 Indian Tamil-language romantic comedy film written and directed by Santhosh P. Jayakumar and produced by K.E.Gnanavel Raja. The movie stars Arya and Sayyeshaa in the lead roles. It is a remake of the 2015 Telugu film Bhale Bhale Magadivoy. The music for the film is composed by Balamurali Balu. Soon after the film's release, lead actors Arya and Sayyeshaa got married.

Plot

The protagonist, Rajinikanth (Arya), was born in a theatre screening Dharmathin Thalaivan, and like one of Rajinikanth's characters in that film, has a forgetful nature. The film doffs its hat at the older film by introducing its protagonist in underwear as he has forgotten to wear pants. This condition of Rajini is a constant source of embarrassment to his parents Ramanathan (Aadukalam Naren) and Lakshmi (Uma Padmanabhan), as they cannot find a suitable match for him. One prospective girl's father Sathyamoorthy (Sampath Raj) insults Rajini because of this. As fate would have it, Rajini ends up falling in love with Sathyamoorthy's daughter Vandhana (Sayyeshaa), but she is unaware of Rajini's forgetfulness. How long can Rajini continue with this facade, especially with Ajay (Lijeesh), a cop who wants to marry Vandhana and is trying to expose him?

Cast 

Arya as Rajinikanth Ramanathan aka Ghajinikanth, the amnesiac protagonist who falls in love with Vandhana
Sayyeshaa as Vandhana Sathyamoorthy, Rajini's girlfriend who is unaware of his forgetfulness
Aadukalam Naren as Ramanathan, Rajini's father
Uma as Lakshmi Ramanathan, Rajini's mother
Sampath Raj as Sathyamoorthy, Vandhana's father
Lijeesh as Inspector Ajay, a cop who wants to marry Vandhana
Rajendran as Rajini's friend
Karunakaran as Karuna
Kaali Venkat as Uthaman
Delhi Ganesh as Rajini's grandfather
Sulakshana as Rajini's grandmother
Madhan Bob as Rajini's boss
Manobala as Kamal Vishwanathan
K. Sivasankar as Mohan's father
Venkat Subha as broker
Linga as Police officer
Rahul Thatha as area friend
Neelima Rani as Gayathri, Vandhana's sister-in-law
K. S. G. Venkatesh as Gayathri's father
Dubbing Janaki as Kamal's mother
Jangiri Madhumitha as Mrs. Uthaman
Sheela as Gayathri's mother
Rekha Suresh as Mrs. Kamal Vishwanathan
Hema Rajkumar
Karnaa Radha as shopkeeper
Baba Bhaskar in a special appearance

Production 
In October 2015, a Tamil remake of the Telugu film Bhale Bhale Magadivoy (2015) with G. V. Prakash Kumar as the protagonist was announced, but never came to fruition. In late November 2017, Studio Green announced that they would collaborate with filmmaker Santhosh P. Jayakumar for a comedy film starring  Arya and Sayyeshaa in the lead roles. Titled Ghajinikanth, the film was revealed to be a remake of Bhale Bhale Magadivoy, and the first look poster had Arya in an ethnic attire resembling a character portrayed by Rajinikanth in the 1988 film, Dharmathin Thalaivan. The title is a portmanteau of the words "Ghajini" and "Rajinikanth", and was titled so because of the forgetful nature of Rajinikanth's character in Dharmathin Thalaivan and Suriya's character in Ghajini (2005). The shoot began with a song sequence shot in Thailand, before the team completed scenes in Chennai. Santhosh was directing this alongside another film Iruttu Araiyil Murattu Kuththu (2018). Shooting ended in 39 days.

Soundtrack 
The soundtrack was composed by Balamurali Balu.

Release
Production budget of the film was valued at 8 crore excluding Arya's salary. The satellite rights of the film were sold to STAR Vijay.

Critical reception
Indian Express wrote "There are several ways to keep the viewer engaged - it could be through the story, its characters, the writing or the filmmaking. Sadly, Ghajinikanth doesn't tick any of the boxes." Times of India wrote "Despite the film offering great scope for comedy, Ghajinikanth is entertaining only in places." Sify called it "Family-friendly comedy entertainer" and wrote "Overall, Ghajinikanth is a time pass entertainer and you will enjoy watching it with family and friends!"

References

External links
 

Indian romantic comedy films
Films shot in Chennai
Films shot in Thailand
2010s Tamil-language films
2018 romantic comedy films
Tamil remakes of Telugu films
Films scored by Balamurali Balu